Boston, officially the Municipality of Boston,  is a 3rd class municipality in the province of Davao Oriental, Philippines. According to the 2020 census, it has a population of 14,618 people.

It is the Northernmost and least populated municipality of Davao Oriental.

Geography

Climate
Boston has a tropical rainforest climate (Af) with heavy to very heavy rainfall year-round and with extremely heavy rainfall in January.

Barangays
Boston is politically subdivided into 8 barangays.
 Cabasagan
 Caatihan
 Cawayanan
 Poblacion
 San Jose
 Sibajay
 Carmen
 Simulao

Demographics

Economy

References

External links
 Boston Profile at the DTI Cities and Municipalities Competitive Index
 [ Philippine Standard Geographic Code]
 Philippine Census Information
 Local Governance Performance Management System

Municipalities of Davao Oriental